General Álvarez may refer to:

Donato Álvarez (1825–1913), Argentine general
Gregorio Conrado Álvarez (1925–2016), Uruguayan Army general
Juan Antonio Álvarez de Arenales (1770–1831), Argentine and Bolivian general 
Juan Álvarez (1790–1867), Mexican general
Mariano Álvarez (1818–1924), Filipino revolutionary general
Pascual Álvarez (1861–1923), Filipino revolutionary general
Santiago Álvarez (general) (1872–1930), Filipino revolutionary general